Liske may refer to:

Places
Liske, Michigan, an unincorporated community located in Pulawski Township, Presque Isle County, Michigan, United States

People with the surname
Ksawery Liske (1838–1891), Polish historian
Pete Liske (1942), American football quarterback

See also